Navavadaj is an area located in Ahmedabad, India.

References

Neighbourhoods in Ahmedabad